Helianthus × cinereus is a species of sunflower native to the United States, in Missouri, Kentucky, Indiana, and Ohio. H. cinereus was proposed as a new species by Torrey and Gray in 1842. It is a natural hybrid with similar features to artificial hybrids between Helianthus mollis and Helianthus occidentalis.

References

cinereus
Flora of the United States
Plants described in 1842
Hybrid plants